Hiroyama (written: 弘山 or 廣山) is a Japanese surname. Notable people with the surname include:

 , Japanese long-distance runner
 , Japanese footballer

Japanese-language surnames